Kasper Winther Jørgensen (born 21 March 1985, in Copenhagen) is a Danish rower. He competed in the lightweight coxless four at the 2012 Summer Olympics, winning the bronze medal. He was a member of the Gold Four.

External links
 

1985 births
Living people
Danish male rowers
Rowers from Copenhagen
Rowers at the 2012 Summer Olympics
Rowers at the 2016 Summer Olympics
Olympic rowers of Denmark
Olympic silver medalists for Denmark
Olympic bronze medalists for Denmark
Olympic medalists in rowing
Medalists at the 2012 Summer Olympics
Medalists at the 2016 Summer Olympics
World Rowing Championships medalists for Denmark
European Rowing Championships medalists